The National Party of Egypt is an Egyptian political party made up of former members of the NDP.

It was founded and led by Anwar Sadat's nephew, Talaat Sadat, who was the last chairman of the NDP. Another prominent member is Tawfik Okasha.

References

2011 establishments in Egypt
Political parties established in 2011